RDX are duo of reggae recording artists, producers and performers: Deejay Renigade (Carlton Williams) from the Waterhouse in Kingston, Jamaica and Singer Delomar (Andre Bedward) from Kencot in Kingston, Jamaica. They have had several chart hits. They have also toured internationally to the United States and Canada, across Europe, Japan, the Caribbean and have performed on concerts in London, United Kingdom, Uganda and Kenya in Africa, Mauritius, Mayotte, Seychelles and Roatan islands.

Williams and Bedward began their dancehall music career in 2003 as members of a group called "Xsytment". In 2006, they broke away and formed the duo RDX. In 2007 they released the hit single "Dance".

Their collaborations have included Lose Yourself with Major Lazer, Mash Up The Place with Sak Noel & Salvi and Ser Libre with Konshens. Broad Out was their 7th chart topper in Jamaica. Their other popular songs include Bend Over, Kotch, Ride It, Jump and Bang!.

They received Group of the year honors in 2007 and 2008 as well as four number one songs in Jamaica: Daggering, Dance, Everybody Dance, and Dancers Anthem. They also hit the charts internationally with Skip (Poland), Movements (Poland and Panama), Deliver Me (Guyana) and For The Girls (Trinidad).

RDX release their debut albumTo The World in 2008 titled and their second studio album Level Up in 2017. The lead single from Level Up was Shake Your Bam Bam, an interpretation of [[Sister Nancy|Sister Nancy'''s]] classic reggae hit song 'Bam Bam'. The song spent over 20 weeks atop the sales chart for distributor 21st Hapilos and the subsequent music video racked up over 25 million views on Youtube. In 2019, RDX released the girls anthems Set Good and JAW'' on the Apt.19 Music & Blaqk Sheep Music labels respectively.

References

Jamaican reggae musical groups